Morula cernohorskyi is a species of sea snail, a marine gastropod mollusk in the family Muricidae, the murex snails or rock snails.

Description

Distribution
This marine species occurs off Mururoa, French Polynesia

References

 Houart, R. & Tröndle, J., 1997. Additions to "les Muricidae de Polynésie Française" and description of a new species of Morula Schumacher, 1817 (Muricidae, Rapaninae) from French Polynesia. Apex 12(1): 1–7

External links
 MNHN, Paris: holotype

cernohorskyi
Gastropods described in 1997